Kudryashyovsky is a rural locality (a khutor) in Dobrinskoye Rural Settlement, Uryupinsky District, Volgograd Oblast, Russia. The population was 153 as of 2010. There are 4 streets.

Geography 
Kudryashyovsky is located in steppe, 28 km northwest of Uryupinsk (the district's administrative centre) by road. Yegorovsky is the nearest rural locality.

References 

Rural localities in Uryupinsky District